Mungalli is a rural locality in the Tablelands Region, Queensland, Australia. In the  Mungalli had a population of 44 people.

History 
Brook's Road State School opened circa 1927 and closed in 1954. It was at 12 Campbell Road (corner of Brooks Road).

In the  Mungalli had a population of 44 people.

References 

Tablelands Region
Localities in Queensland